Hot R&B/Hip-Hop Songs is a chart published by Billboard that ranks the top-performing songs in the United States in African-American-oriented musical genres; the chart has undergone various name changes since its launch in 1958 to reflect the evolution of such genres.  In 1986, the chart was published under the title Hot Black Singles.  During the year, 26 different singles topped the chart, based on playlists submitted by radio stations and surveys of retail sales outlets. 

In the issue of Billboard dated January 4, Eugene Wilde was at number one with "Don't Say No Tonight", the song's third week in the top spot.  The following week it was replaced by "Say You, Say Me" by Lionel Richie.  The year's third number one was a charity single featuring four artists who had all topped either the Black Singles chart or Billboards pop chart, the Hot 100.  Credited to Dionne and Friends, "That's What Friends Are For" featured Dionne Warwick, Gladys Knight, Stevie Wonder and Elton John, and had been organized by Warwick as a fund-raiser for the American Foundation for AIDS Research.  The song also topped the Hot 100, and won the Grammy Awards for Best Pop Performance by a Duo or Group with Vocals and Song of the Year.  "Say You, Say Me" by Lionel Richie, "How Will I Know" by Whitney Houston,"Kiss" by Prince and the Revolution, "On My Own" by Patti LaBelle and Michael McDonald, and "There'll Be Sad Songs (To Make You Cry)" by Billy Ocean also topped both the Black Singles chart and the Hot 100.  

Many of the acts that topped the chart in 1986 did so for the first time, including Meli'sa Morgan, Janet Jackson, Stephanie Mills, Michael McDonald, Timex Social Club, Jean Carne, Shirley Jones, Gwen Guthrie, LeVert, Oran "Juice" Jones, Gregory Abbott, and Melba Moore.  El DeBarge gained his first solo chart-topper, having previously spent time at number one with family group DeBarge, and Bobby Brown reached the peak position for the first time as a solo artist following number ones as a member of New Edition.  When "That's What Friends Are For" reached number one, it marked the first Black Singles chart-topper for both Warwick and John.  Janet Jackson, Billy Ocean, and Freddie Jackson were the only artists to have multiple number one singles during the year.  Freddie Jackson spent a total of five weeks in the top spot, the most of any act.  His song "Tasty Love" held the peak position for four weeks, tying with "Kiss" and "On My Own" for the longest unbroken run atop the chart.  Brown's track "Girlfriend" was the final number one of the year.

Chart history

See also
 List of Billboard Hot 100 number-one singles of 1986

References

Works cited

1986
1986 record charts
1986 in American music